The lizard triplefin, Crocodilichthys gracilis, is a fish of the family Tripterygiidae and only member of the genus Crocodilichthys, found in the Gulf of California in the eastern Central Pacific at depths down to 38 m. Its length is only up to about 64 mm.

References

External links
 

Tripterygiidae
Fish of the Gulf of California
Fish described in 1991